Manuel Sanguily (7 February 1933 – 15 November 2022) was a Cuban swimmer who competed in the 1952 Summer Olympics and in the 1956 Summer Olympics.

References

External links

1933 births
2022 deaths
Sportspeople from Havana
Cuban male swimmers
Male breaststroke swimmers
Olympic swimmers of Cuba
Swimmers at the 1952 Summer Olympics
Swimmers at the 1955 Pan American Games
Swimmers at the 1956 Summer Olympics
Swimmers at the 1959 Pan American Games
Pan American Games silver medalists for Cuba
Pan American Games bronze medalists for Cuba
Pan American Games medalists in swimming
Competitors at the 1954 Central American and Caribbean Games
Central American and Caribbean Games gold medalists for Cuba
Central American and Caribbean Games medalists in swimming
Medalists at the 1955 Pan American Games
Medalists at the 1959 Pan American Games